Konstantin Anatoliyevich Bakun (born 15 March 1985) is a Ukrainian volleyball player of Russian citizenship (since 2011), member of the Russia men's national volleyball team, Ukrainian Champion (2006, 2008), Russian Champion (2020).

Sporting achievements

Clubs
 CEV Cup
  2015/2016 – with Gazprom-Ugra Surgut
  2017/2018 – with Belogorie Belgorod

 National championships
 2005/2006  Ukrainian Championship, with Azot Cherkasy
 2007/2008  Ukrainian Championship, with Lokomotiv Kiev
 2019/2020  Russian Championship, with Lokomotiv Novosibirsk

Individual awards
 2015/2016: Russian Championship – Best Scorer
 2017/2018: CEV Cup – Most Valuable Player

References

External links
 Player profile at CEV.eu
 Player profile at WorldofVolley.com
 Player profile at Volleybox.net

1985 births
Living people
Sportspeople from Donetsk
Ukrainian emigrants to Russia
Naturalised citizens of Russia
Ukrainian men's volleyball players
Russian men's volleyball players
Olympic volleyball players of Russia
Volleyball players at the 2016 Summer Olympics
Ukrainian expatriate sportspeople in Qatar
Expatriate volleyball players in Qatar